Jost Kobusch (born August 3, 1992, in Bielefeld) is a German mountaineer and author.

Early life 
Kobusch grew up in Borgholzhausen and, after an early divorce of his parents, was raised by his father, a carpenter. At the age of twelve, he started to participate in climbing courses organized by his school.
 After his Abitur, he joined the Bundeswehr as a Gebirgsjäger (mountain troops). Since 2016, Kobusch is living in Chemnitz as a student of the Technische Universität Chemnitz.

Mountaineering 
In 2013, Kobusch traveled to Kyrgyzstan. Due to inclement weather he was unable to reach the top of Pik Lenin, however, he succeeded to become the first to ascent a mountain he subsequently named, Pik Yoko (4,048  m).
In April 2014, he became the youngest solo climber of Ama Dablam not using supplemental oxygen.

Kobusch became famous when he filmed the partial destruction of the Mount Everest base camp by an avalanche on April 25, 2015 that had been triggered by the April 2015 Nepal earthquake.

On May 1, 2016, Kobusch reached the top of Annapurna (8,091 m) without oxygen support.

In 2017, Kobusch was the first to reach the top of  Nangpai Gosum II (7,296 m); he was solo and did not use supplemental oxygen. For this ascent, he was nominated by Piolet d'Or for its annual "Significant Ascents" award.

In the winter of 2019/2020 Kobusch attempted his first solo Mount Everest ascent without supplemental oxygen but had to give up at 7,360 m. His second attempt to ascent Mount Everest solo and without supplemental oxygen started in the winter of 2021/2022. Kobusch chose a route over the West Ridge avoiding the Khumbu Icefall. According to Krzysztof Wielicki who did the first winter ascent of Mount Everest using the standard route, his chances of success would be 50-50. Being exposed to almost continuous bad weather that wrecked five tents Kobush was not able to get to the top but intends to return in 2 years for another attempt.

Ascents (selection) 
 2014: Ama Dablam, - solo, no supplemental oxygen
 2016: Annapurna, - no supplemental oxygen
 2017: Nangpai Gosum II, - solo, no supplemental oxygen
 2018: New route Way of the Ancestors to reach Carstensz-Pyramide
 2019: First ascent of Amotsang (6,393 m), Damodar Himalaya
 2021: First ascent of Purbung (6,465 m) with Nicolas Scheidtweiler
 2023: Denali - solo winter ascent via Messner Couloir

Writings 
 Ich. Oben. Allein. Riva, 2017, ISBN 978-3-7423-0079-9
 Reinhold Messner: Mord am Unmöglichen. Edited by Luca Calvi and  Alessandro Filippini, Malik, 2018, ISBN 978-3890295138. Chapter Jost Kobusch: Es wird immer Neues zu entdecken geben, Pages 188-192
 Reinhold Messner: „Gehe ich nicht, gehe ich kaputt.“ Briefe aus dem Himalaja. Malik, 2020, ISBN 978-3890295022, Chapter Jost Kobusch: Mount. Everest. Base Camp, January 2, 2020, Page 386

External links 
 Jost Kobusch website
 Video of the avalanche  at the Base Camp, Mount Everest, April 25, 2015

References 

German mountain climbers
1992 births
Living people